Acker's Cottage is one of the first stone houses on New Zealand's Stewart Island. The cottage was placed on the Heritage New Zealand list of historic places (category I) and has been restored by Heritage New Zealand and the Department of Conservation as an example of an early vernacular building. Built by Lewis Acker, it is the oldest whaling cottage in New Zealand and one of the earliest stone buildings on Stewart Island.

Lewis Acker
Lewis Acker (c.1817–11 July 1885) was a New Zealand whaler, boatbuilder, trader, farmer and saw miller. He was born in New York City, US. Acker married a Kai Tahu woman, Mary Pui, and together they had nine children. After Acker retired from whaling, he built the cottage on Harrold Bay, Stewart Island. He quarried the stone at Oreti Beach and carried it across Foveaux Strait in his boat. He cleared the nearby land for cultivation in an area that is now called Acker's Point. Acker and his wife lived in this cottage until the late 1850s. Since that time it has been used as a smithy, storeroom, brewery and workshop.

References

Heritage New Zealand Category 1 historic places in Southland, New Zealand